The Sagamore is a Victorian-era resort hotel located on Lake George in Bolton Landing, New York. It occupies the private Green Island on Lake George. Since 1983, it has been listed in the National Register of Historic Places.

The Sagamore is a member of Historic Hotel of America, the official program of the National Trust for Historic Preservation.

History

The Sagamore opened in 1883, financed by a number of prominent summer residents. It soon succeeded in attracting a wealthy clientele.

The hotel was named after "the Sagamore", an American Indian character in the James Fenimore Cooper novel The Last of the Mohicans (1826). Several of Lake George's nearby islands are also named after characters from the book.

Twice damaged by fire, in 1893 and 1914, the Sagamore was rebuilt in early 1921. A group of investors including Dr. William G. Beckers of New York City, one of the hotel's early stockholders, Adolph Ochs, the owner and publisher of the New York Times, Dr. Willy Myers, a New York City surgeon and William H. Bixby, a St. Louis industrialist, hired prominent local architect and structural engineer Robert Rheinlander to oversee the effort.

Throughout its history, the Sagamore has been a social center for wealthy tourists and residents of Millionaires' Row, the stately mansions along Lake George's western shore.

The hotel eventually fell into disrepair before closing its doors in 1981.

In 1983, one hundred years after construction of the first Sagamore, builder and real estate developer Norman Wolgin of Philadelphia purchased the hotel and restored it. In the same year, the resort was listed in the National Register of Historic Places.

The resort is currently managed by Portsmouth, New Hampshire-based Ocean Properties, which bought it in 2008.

See also
 List of Historic Hotels of America

References

External links

 The Sagamore - official web site

Hotel buildings on the National Register of Historic Places in New York (state)
Buildings and structures in Warren County, New York
Tourist attractions in Warren County, New York
National Register of Historic Places in Warren County, New York
Preferred Hotels & Resorts
Historic Hotels of America